Collagen alpha-1(IX) chain is a protein that in humans is encoded by the COL9A1 gene.

This gene encodes one of the three alpha chains of type IX collagen, a collagen component of hyaline cartilage. Type IX collagen is usually found in tissues containing type II collagen, a fibrillar collagen. Studies in knockout mice have shown that synthesis of the alpha 1 chain is essential for assembly of type IX collagen molecules, a heterotrimeric molecule, and that lack of type IX collagen is associated with early onset osteoarthritis. Mutations in this gene may be associated with multiple epiphyseal dysplasia. Two transcript variants have been identified for this gene.

References

External links
  GeneReviews/NCBI/NIH/UW entry on Multiple Epiphyseal Dysplasia, Dominant
  GeneReviews/NCBI/NIH/UW entry on Stickler Syndrome

Further reading

Collagens